Mikhail Iosifovich Nosyrev (May 28, 1924 – May 28, 1981) was a Soviet composer. He was born in Leningrad and died in Voronezh.

Biography 
In 1941, during World War II, he was a first year student at the Leningrad Conservatory. Two years later he became an orchestra soloist at the radio orchestra of Leningrad.

In 1943, Nosyrev was arrested by the NKVD along with his mother and stepfather and condemned to death according to the Article 58 of the penal code of the RSFSR. The main evidence of the counter-revolutionary activities of Nosyrev was his diary discovered during the search of his home. One month later, his death penalty was commuted into ten years in a gulag, that he served in the camp of Vorkuta in the Komi ASSR, 2,500 km away from Moscow, and his term served, was exiled in the town of Syktyvkar where he worked as the conductor of the State Theater.

From 1958 to 1981, Nosyrev was the director of the opera and ballet theater of Voronezh.

In 1967, he became a member of the Union of Soviet Composers. His membership in it was supported by Dmitri Shostakovich's recommendation.

He wrote four symphonies, three concertos (for violin, piano and cello), four string quartets, the ballets The Unforgettable, The River Don Cossacks, Song of Triumphant Love (from Ivan Turgenev's novel of the same name) and around 100 pieces of chamber music.

In 1988, seven years after his death, he was completely forgiven by the Supreme Court of the USSR.

References

External links 
http://www.nosyrev.com/biography

1924 births
1981 deaths
Russian ballet composers
Gulag detainees
Modernist composers
Russian opera composers
Male opera composers
Russian male classical composers
Soviet artists
20th-century Russian male musicians
Soviet composers